Jouko is a masculine Finnish given name and may refer to:

Jouko Ahola (born 1970), Finnish strongman, powerlifter and actor
Jouko Grip (born 1949), Finnish paralympic athlete
Jouko Halmekoski (born 1937), Finnish writer
Jouko Hassi (born 1959), Finnish sprinter
Jouko Jääskeläinen (born 1952), Finnish politician
Jouko Jokisalo, Finnish communist and KGB spy
Jouko Karjalainen (born 1956), Finnish Nordic combined skier
Jouko Keskinen (born 1950), Finnish actor
Jouko Kuha (born 1939), Finnish long-distance runner
Jouko Lindgrén (born 1955), Finnish sailor
Jouko Lindstedt (born 1955), Finnish linguist
Jouko Parviainen (born 1958), Finnish Nordic combined skier
Jouko Salomäki (born 1962), Finnish Greco-Roman wrestler
Jouko Törmänen (born 1954), Finnish ski jumper
Jouko Turkka (born 1942), Finnish theater director
Jouko Vesterlund (born 1959), Finnish speed skater
Jouko Viitamäki (born 1949), Finnish sprint canoer

Finnish masculine given names